Blue Resolution -Ao no Shikaku Kaiseki do- (Blue Resolution－青の思覚解析度－), also known as Quantum Mechanics Rainbow III: Blue Resolution, is the eighth (seventh of entirely new music) solo album by artist Daisuke Asakura. It is the third in a series of seven albums released by Asakura in 2004, called Quantum Mechanics Rainbow. Each album revolves around a different color of the rainbow and a different term relating to Quantum Mechanics. This album revolves around the color blue. It also contains guest vocals by Mayumi Fujita (Track 5).

Track listing

All songs produced, composed and arranged by Daisuke Asakura

References
 Official Daisuke Asakura Profile
 Daisuke Asakura Discography on Sony Music Japan
 Scans of the album, used for album cover and guest vocal information

2004 albums
Daisuke Asakura albums